Felipe Airton Bandero (born 6 December 1988) is a Brazilian volleyball player who has played in Brazil, Europe, the Middle East and South Korea. 

He currently plays for Cheonan Hyundai Skywalkers in the Korean V-League. Where he has had the unusual distinction of having played for five different teams in the last five seasons.

References

External links

  at Volleybox

1988 births
Living people
Brazilian volleyball players